Giovanni Invernizzi (26 August 1931 – 28 February 2005) was an Italian professional football player and coach, who played as a midfielder.

Honours

Manager
Inter Milan
 Serie A: 1970–71
 European Cup runner up: 1971-72

External links
 

1931 births
2005 deaths
Italian footballers
Serie A players
Association football midfielders
Italy international footballers
Inter Milan players
Genoa C.F.C. players
U.S. Triestina Calcio 1918 players
Udinese Calcio players
Torino F.C. players
Venezia F.C. players
Como 1907 players
Italian football managers
Inter Milan managers